A twelve-part abrogative referendum was held in Italy on 11 June 1995. Voters were asked whether they approved of the repealing (or partial repealing) of laws on union representation, union dues, collective contracts for public sector workers, internal exile for mafia members, public ownership of RAI, concessions for television channels, advertising breaks during films, television publicity, commercial licensing, local council elections and shopping hours. Only five of the twelve proposals were passed.

Results

Repealing of the law on union representation

Partial repealing of the law on union representation

Repealing of the law on the direct deduction of union dues from employees' salaries

Repealing of the law on collective contracts for public sector workers

Repealing of the law on the internal exile of mafia members

Repealing of the law on public ownership of RAI
If approved, this proposal would allow for the partial privatisation of RAI.

Repealing of the law regulating commercial licences
This proposal would limit ownership of television channels to one per person. This was denounced by Silvio Berlusconi (who owned three channels) as a "post-Communist plot".

Repealing of the law on television channel concessions

Repealing of the law allowing advertising breaks during films
This proposal would have restricted advertising breaks during the screening of films on television.

Repealing of the law allowing television publicity grouping
This proposal would restrict advertising agencies to controlling the advertising of just two channels. This would stop Publitalia from selling advertising space in all three channels owned by Berlusconi.

Repealing of the law on shop opening hours

Repealing of the law on local council elections

References

1995 referendums
1995 in Italy
Referendums in Italy
June 1995 events in Europe